USS LST-915 was an  in the United States Navy. Like many of her class, she was not named and is properly referred to by her hull designation.

Construction
LST-915 was laid down on 22 March 1944, at Hingham, Massachusetts, by the Bethlehem-Hingham Shipyard; launched on 3 May 1944; and commissioned on 27 May 1944.

Service history
Following the war, LST-915 performed occupation duty in the Far East until early April 1946. She returned to the United States and was decommissioned on 25 June 1946, and struck from the Navy list on 31 July that same year. On 19 June 1948, the ship was sold to the Humble Oil and Refining Co., Houston, Texas, for operation.

Notes

Citations

Bibliography 

Online resources

External links
 

 

LST-542-class tank landing ships
World War II amphibious warfare vessels of the United States
Ships built in Hingham, Massachusetts
1944 ships